Maritza Bustamante Abidar, better known as Maritza Bustamante, (born September 26, 1980) is a Venezuelan actress and model. Sister of the animator Nelson Bustamante. She is mostly known for her participation in Venezuelan telenovelas with the TV network Venevisión.

Career

In 2010, she signed a contract with the TV network Telemundo. Her first soap opera for the network was The dog love.

In 2010, she worked as an antagonist in the soap opera, El fantasma de Elena.

In 2012, she participates in the soap opera, Relaciones Peligrosas, remake of the Spanish series Física o Química.

Filmography

References

External links 
 

1980 births
Living people
Actresses from Caracas
Venezuelan telenovela actresses